James Anderson (27 June 1842 – 16 August 1905) was a nineteenth-century professional golfer who won The Open Championship three consecutive times, from 1877 to 1879.

Early life
Anderson was born in St Andrews, Scotland, the son of David "Da" Anderson, greenskeeper at the Old Course. Da also sold tea and lemonade on the Old Course from a portable cart. James Anderson began caddying over the Old Course from a young age, while Allan Robertson was still alive, and took up golf around the same time. It took James many years to reach his top championship form (age 35), in contrast to the nine-years-younger Young Tom Morris, who won his first Open at age 17 in 1868.

Golf career
Anderson's Open Championships victories were at Musselburgh in 1877; Prestwick Golf Club in 1878; and St Andrews in 1879. He is one of only four golfers who have won three consecutive Opens, alongside Young Tom Morris (1868–1870), Bob Ferguson (1880–82) and Peter Thomson (1954–56).
Anderson did not compete in 1880 because the date of the tournament was set so late that he missed entry. He was runner-up the next year 1881. His nephew David was runner-up in 1888, and all of his sons were golf professionals.

Death and legacy
Anderson died in a poorhouse in Thornton, Fife, Scotland. He won the Open Championship three consecutive times: 1877, 1878, and 1879.

Major championships

Wins (3)

Results timeline

Note: Anderson played only in The Open Championship.
NT = No tournament
DNP = Did not play
"T" indicates a tie for a place
Green background for wins, yellow for top-10

References

External links
The Principal's Nose
Antique Golf Clubs from Scotland: The Anderson Family

Scottish male golfers
Winners of men's major golf championships
Golfers from St Andrews
1842 births
1905 deaths